David Grant Noel (born June 11, 1980, in Ridgeley, West Virginia) is a former American football quarterback who played college football at Virginia Tech. He briefly played for the Baltimore Ravens of the National Football League (NFL).

Early life and high school career
Noel was born on June 11, 1980, in Ridgeley, West Virginia. He was ranked the number two ranked quarterback in the northeast by PrepStar and he was named a top fifteen quarterback in the northeast by the G&W Recruiting Report out of Frankfort High School. He committed to Virginia Tech in 1998.

College career
In 1998, Noel was redshirted.

In 1999 and 2000, Noel backed up future first overall pick Michael Vick. In those two years as a backup to Vick, Virginia Tech went 11–1 in 1999 and an appearance in the Sugar Bowl, in 2000, the team went 11–1 again and won the Gator Bowl.

In 2001, Noel's junior season, he was named the starting quarterback after Vick left for the NFL Draft. He was injured during a summer workout that caused him to miss three-to-six weeks, he was still healthy for the start of the 2001 season. He led the team to a 6–0 record to start the season and the team was ranked as high as five going into their game against Syracuse which would be the team's first loss of the season falling 14–22. The loss against the Orange would begin the final stretch of the season that saw the team lose four of their last six including a Gator Bowl loss against Florida State. Noel finished the season with 1,826 yards, sixteen touchdowns, and eleven interceptions as the Hokies ended the season 8–4. 

In 2002, Noel was once again slated to be the starter despite tearing his ACL he would play through it for his redshirt senior season. The team started 1–0 after beating Arkansas State where he did not finish the game. Noel got injured in the team's second game against LSU. He would never be able to regain his starting spot again as sophomore Bryan Randall took over and led the team to an 8–0 start. The team finished the year 10–4 as they lost four of their last six. Against number one ranked Miami, Noel came in the game in relief of Randall and completed a seven-yard touchdown pass to Ernest Wilford to bring the Hokies within two scores of the Hurricanes, though the late Hokies rally would fall short.

Statistics

Professional career
Noel briefly played for the Baltimore Ravens of the National Football League (NFL) after going undrafted in the 2003 NFL Draft.

References

External links
 College Stats

1980 births
Living people
Virginia Tech Hokies football players
Baltimore Ravens players
American football quarterbacks